Kaarepere is a village in Jõgeva Parish, Jõgeva County in eastern Estonia.

Kaarepere is served by Kaarepere railway station.

References

Villages in Jõgeva County
Kreis Dorpat